Forensic Science International: Genetics is a peer-reviewed academic journal of forensic science, dedicated to the applications of genetics in the administration of justice. The journal was established in 2007 and is published by Elsevier. The journal is edited by Angel Carracedo (University of Santiago de Compostela). The journal publishes supplements in Forensic Science International: Genetics Supplement Series since 2008, seven of them in total, the last one appearing in 2019. These are dedicated to publish the proceedings of the biannual congresses of the International Society for Forensic Genetics.

Abstracting and Indexing
Forensic Science International is abstracted and indexed in the following databases:

See also
Forensic Science International

External links
Forensic Science International: Genetics
Forensic Science International: Genetics Supplement Series
Forensic Science International:Genetics @ Elsevier
Forensic Science International: Genetics Supplement Series @ Elsevier

Bimonthly journals
Elsevier academic journals
Criminology journals
Publications established in 2007
Forensic science journals